The pontine raphe nucleus is one of the raphe nuclei. It is located in the pontine tegmentum.

Pons